This 15 Me (styled in all caps) is the thirteenth studio album of Filipino singer-actress Sarah Geronimo, the album also set as the 15th anniversary offering of the Philippine's Queen of Pop. It was released on digital platforms on April 13, 2018, whilst physical copies became available on April 14, the day of Geronimo's 15th anniversary concert with the same title, held at the Smart Araneta Coliseum. To date the album sold 30,000 units copies including physical album copies, digital downloads and album-equivalent unit streams. The album debuted at number one on both iTunes Philippines and Macau Album Charts and also landed on international iTunes charts including the United States, Singapore and Canada.

Release 
The album became available for downloads on April 13, 2018 and was officially released the next day, during Geronimo's 15th anniversary concert also entitled This 15 Me. The album went straight to number one on iTunes Philippines album charts and stayed on top for a week.

Track listing

Tour 

This 15 Me is the promotional world tour for Sarah Geronimo's thirteenth studio album of the same name. It also celebrates Geronimo's fifteenth year in the showbiz industry. She kicked off the tour in Manila which set the record for Highest Grossing Local Concert held in Smart Araneta Coliseum in history. Netflix acquired the rights to stream the concert film starting in August 2019 making Geronimo the first Southeast Asian artist to have a concert film on the said platform.

References 

Sarah Geronimo albums
2018 albums